Ross Township is one of the twelve townships of Greene County, Ohio, United States. As of the 2010 census, the population was 750.

Geography
Located in the northeastern corner of the county, it borders the following townships:
Madison Township, Clark County - north
Stokes Township, Madison County - northeast
Jefferson Township, Fayette County - southeast
Silvercreek Township - south
New Jasper Township - southwest
Cedarville Township - west

It is the only township in the county with a border on Madison County.

An uninhabited portion of the village of Jamestown is located in southern Ross Township.

Name and history
Ross Township was established in 1811. Ross was the name of a pioneer settler.

Statewide, other Ross Townships are located in Butler and Jefferson Counties.

Government

The township is governed by a three-member board of trustees, who are elected in November of odd-numbered years to a four-year term beginning on the following January 1. Two are elected in the year after the presidential election and one is elected in the year before it. There is also an elected township fiscal officer, who serves a four-year term beginning on April 1 of the year after the election, which is held in November of the year before the presidential election. Vacancies in the fiscal officership or on the board of trustees are filled by the remaining trustees.

References

External links
County website

Townships in Greene County, Ohio
Townships in Ohio
1811 establishments in Ohio
Populated places established in 1811